Ierax ("Hawk") was an  which had been built for Argentina as Santa Fe. She served in the Hellenic Royal Navy from 1912 to 1946.

Construction as ARA Santa Fe 

The second was completed as Santa Fe. They were purchased in 1912 by Greece, ready for delivery, each for the sum of £148,000, when the Balkan Wars seemed likely. Ierax was accepted by Captain Ath. Miaoulis, RHN in Palermo, Sicily where she arrived manned by a foreign crew.

Service history
During the Balkan Wars, the Royal Hellenic Navy purchased only the minimum amount of ammunition, 3,000 rounds of torpedoes. Torpedoes were not available for this class of ship, and for this reason these ships were initially named 'scouts' rather than 'destroyers'. On 21 October 1912, under the command of Commander A. Vratsanos, RHN, Ierax was part of the Greek flotilla that captured the island of Psara from the Ottomans.

During World War I, Greece belatedly entered the war on the side of the Triple Entente and, due to Greece's neutrality the four Aetos-class ships were seized by the Allies in October 1916, taken over by the French in November, and served in the French Navy from 1917-18. By 1918, they were back on escort duty under Greek colors, mainly in the Aegean Sea.

Ierax participated in the evacuation of Greeks from Russia during the Russian Civil War in 1918, and saw action in the Greco-Turkish War (1919-1922) in the Sea of Marmara and the Aegean Sea.

After the war, Ierax was refurbished from 1925–1927. She also participated in the Second World War, after surviving the German invasion of April 1941, Ierax was based in Alexandria, Egypt.  In April 1944, a wave of mutiny swept through some of the Hellenic Royal Navy, with seamen agitating in favor of the pro-Communist guerrillas, ELAS, who were fighting a campaign in Greece against the occupying Nazis.  Ierax was one of the ships whose crew mutinied and the mutiny was put down in the early morning hours of 22 April  1944.

After the end of World War II, Ierax was stricken (decommissioned) in 1946.

See also
 History of the Hellenic Navy

References

Aetos-class destroyers
World War II destroyers of Greece
1911 ships
Ships built on the River Mersey